Fenestrida is an extinct order of bryozoans in the class Stenolaemata.

, Fossilworks included the following families:
†Admiratellidae
†Fenestellidae
†Fenestraliidae
†Polyporidae
†Septoporidae
Other sources consider Fenestrata to be a synonym of Fenestrida, and so include more families.

References

Prehistoric animal orders
Stenolaemata
Extinct bryozoans